Phosphomannomutase 2 is an enzyme that in humans is encoded by the PMM2 gene.

Function 

Phosphomannomutase 2 catalyzes the isomerization of mannose 6-phosphate to mannose 1-phosphate.  Mannose 1-phosphate is a precursor to GDP-mannose necessary for the synthesis of dolichol-P-oligosaccharides.  Mutations in the gene have been shown to cause defects in the protein glycosylation pathway which manifest as the congenital disorder of glycosylation PMM2 deficiency.

References

Further reading

External links 
  GeneReviews/NCBI/NIH/UW entry on Congenital Disorders of Glycosylation Overview
  GeneReviews/NIH/NCBI/UW entry on PMM2-CDG (CDG-Ia)Carbohydrate-Deficient Glycoprotein Syndrome, Type 1a; Congenital Disorder of Glycosylation Type 1a; Jaeken Syndrome  
  OMIM entries on Carbohydrate-Deficient Glycoprotein Syndrome, Type 1a; Congenital Disorder of Glycosylation Type 1a; Jaeken Syndrome